Lookout Summit—officially listed as "Lookout" in the Geographic Names Information System—is the highest point in Benton County, in the U.S. state of Washington. The mountain is also the highest point in the Rattlesnake Hills, with an elevation  higher than the neighboring, more-well-known Rattlesnake Mountain—which is the second highest peak in the range (as well as the county).

References

Landforms of Benton County, Washington
Ridges of Washington (state)
Mountains of Washington (state)